Seenu Atoll School or Seenu Atoll Madharusa Dhivehi: ސ.އަތޮޅު މަދަރުސާ is a government school in Hulhumeedhoo, Addu City, Republic of Maldives. The school was established on 15 April 1983. The school's motto is "Knowledge Enlightens Life". Seenu Atoll School teaches from Foundation Stage to Key Stage 5. The school, just as all government secondary schools, uses the Cambridge International Examinations (IGCSE) as the final exams for finishing Grade 10.

Seenu Atoll School is the only school in Hulhumeedhoo. Students from both Meedhoo and Hulhudhoo attend Seenu Atoll School. Currently, more than 500 students study in Seenu Atoll School.

School management 
The school's current principal is Aminath Zeeniya. 
The school has many different departments. Including, Science Department, Islam Department, Maths Department, Dhivehi Department, English Department, and Business Department. Each Department has an HoD (Head of Department).

Houses 

 Ghaazee House (Blue)
 Huravee House (Yellow)
 Shamsuddheen House (Red)
 Sikandharee House (Green)

References

 Schools in the Maldives